Rafael Mardanshin (born 24 December 1961, Penza) is a Russian political figure and a deputy of the 7th and 8th State Dumas. 

From 1998 to 2003, Mardanshin was the chairman of the Union of Entrepreneurs of Oktyabrsky. From 1999 to 2003, he was also the deputy of the Oktyabrsky City Council. In 2003-2008, he was the deputy of the State Assembly of the Republic of Bashkortostan of the 3rd convocation. In 2011, Mardanshin was appointed member of the council under the head of the Republic of Bashkortostan for combating corruption and the public council under the Head of the Republic of Bashkortostan for improving the investment climate. In 2011, he was elected deputy of the 6th State Duma. In 2016 and 2021, he was re-elected for the 7th and 8th State Dumas, respectively.

References

1961 births
Living people
United Russia politicians
21st-century Russian politicians
Eighth convocation members of the State Duma (Russian Federation)
Seventh convocation members of the State Duma (Russian Federation)
Sixth convocation members of the State Duma (Russian Federation)
People from Oktyabrsky, Republic of Bashkortostan